Emil Šterbal (born 1970) is a retired Slovene football player, who played as a defender. During most of his playing career Šterbal played in the Slovenian PrvaLiga and made a total of 330 league appearances for Maribor (203) and Drava Ptuj (127). He also scored two league goals; both while a member of Maribor.

See also
NK Maribor players

References

Living people
Slovenian footballers
Association football defenders
NK Maribor players
NK Drava Ptuj players
Place of birth missing (living people)
K.A.A. Gent players
Siirtspor footballers
1970 births